Meiacanthus vicinus, the Sulawesi fangblenny, is a species of combtooth blenny found in the western central Pacific ocean where it is only known from Indonesia.  This species grows to a length of  SL.

References

vicinus
Fish described in 1987